Puttalam is the largest town in Puttalam District, North Western Province, Sri Lanka. Puttalam is the administrative capital of the Puttalam District and governed by an Urban Council.

Climate 
Under the Köppen climate classification, Pattalam has a tropical savanna climate with a short dry season from June to September and a second dry season from January to March. The wet season is mainly from October to December. Temperatures remain steady throughout the year with little variations in between.

Energy 
Seguwantivu Wind Power (Private) Limited an Indian firm invests US$37 million and maintains 25 wind turbines which produce 20 MW s of electricity in Puttalam Seguwantivu region.

Religion 
Puttalam is a multi-cultural and multi-religious town. (86%) of Puttalam's resident's religion is Islam, urban area's are dominated by them. While Buddhist and Christians are significant minorities with a small number of Hindu population.

Source:statistics.gov.lk

Education

National Schools: 

 Ananda National School
 Zahira College
 President's Science College

Provincial Schools 

 Puttalam Hindu Central College
 Thillayadi Muslim Maha Vidhyalaya
 Zahira Primary School

International schools 

 Phoenix International School
 St. Joseph Vaz College
 Ikra International School
 School Of Excellence 

Puttalam also has an Open University.

Notable people

 M. H. M. Naina Marikar -  first elected to the Parliament of Sri Lanka as member for Puttalam
 Sahan Adeesha Cricketer, was born in Puttalam
 Tariq Hisny Composer and Singer, was born in Puttalam
Abdul Baiz Kamardeen - Politician, Former Chairman of  Puttalam Urban Council
Ali Sabri Raheem - Politician, Member of Parliament

References

External links 

 The Portuguese Cultural Imprint on Sri Lanka